Tambura may refer to:
 Tanbur, a category of long-necked, string instrument originating in the Southern or Central Asia (Mesopotamia and Persia/Iran)
 Tanpura, a stringed drone instrument played in India
 Kurdish tanbur, used in Yarsan rituals
 Turkish tambur, instrument played in Turkey
 Yaylı tambur, also played in Turkey
 Tamboori, an Indian melodic instrument similar to a Tanpura
 Balkan tambura, instruments from Macedonia and Bulgaria
 Tamburica, any member of a family of long-necked lutes popular in Eastern and Central Europe
 Tambouras, played in Greece
 Tanbūra (lyre), played in East Africa and the Middle East

See also 
 Bandura, a Ukrainian instrument
 Dombra, an instrument in Kazakhstan, Siberia and Afghanistan
 Domra, a Russian instrument
 Pandura, an instrument played in Ancient Greece and other ancient civilisations from the Mediterranean basin